Hely-Hutchinson v Brayhead Ltd [1968] 1 QB 549 is a UK company law case on the authority of agents to act for a company.

Facts
Lord Suirdale (Richard Michael John Hely-Hutchinson) sued Brayhead Ltd for losses incurred after a failed takeover deal. The CEO, chairman and de facto managing director of Brayhead Ltd, Mr Richards, had guaranteed repayment of money, and had indemnified losses of Lord Suirdale in return for injection of money into Lord Suirdale's company Perdio Electronics Ltd. Perdio Ltd was then taken over by Brayhead Ltd and Lord Suirdale gained a place on Brayhead Ltd's board, but Perdio Ltd's business did not recover. It went into liquidation, Lord Suirdale resigned from Brayhead Ltd’s board and sued for the losses he had incurred. Brayhead Ltd refused to pay on the basis that Mr Richards had no authority to make the guarantee and indemnity contract in the first place.

Roskill J held Mr Richards had apparent authority to bind Brayhead Ltd, and the company appealed.

Judgment
Lord Denning MR held that he did have authority, but it was actual authority because (like a "course of dealing" in contract law) the fact that the board had let Mr Richards continue to act had in fact created actual authority.

Lord Pearson and Lord Wilberforce concurred.

Notes

References

United Kingdom company case law
Hely-Hutchinson family
Court of Appeal (England and Wales) cases
1968 in case law
1968 in British law
Lord Denning cases